Jevtimije Ivanović (Sen Mikluš, Habsburg monarchy, today's Sinnicolau Mare, Romania, 1773 – Sremska Mitrovica, 1849) was a Serbian priest and author of four collections of biographies of notable individuals under the title Novi Plutarh (New Plutarch, 1809–1841).

Biography
Ivanović graduated from the Serbian Orthodox Theological Seminary of Sremski Karlovci and for 38 years while in priesthood and teaching, he also translated and wrote biographies, published between 1809 and 1841. His first parish was in Šid, and in the Kuveždin Monastery, before he settled in 1812 in Zemun from where he retired in 1834.

A novelty in Serbian prose was secular biography at the time, which existed in older Serbian hagiographies, better known as žitije or vita. This trend would continue to develop fully and in direct correlation with classical works. 
 
Ivanović was influenced by Dositej Obradović who wrote the first individual biographies, a genre that expanded to the form of a biographical collection modeled on popular European literature, the type of compilations that were developed by Cornelius Nepos, Sallust and  Plutarch.
 
In 1809, Jevtimije Ivanović published in Buda his first collection of four books under the long title Novi Plutarh ili kratkoje opisanije slavnjejši ljudi sviju naroda and drevnjejši vremena do danas. Po Blanšaru i Šileru svobodno preveden i novimi biografijami umnožen Jeftimijem Ivanovićem(New Plutarch or abridged lives of the greatest men of all nations. According to Blanchard and Schiller freely translated and with new biographies added by Jevtimije Ivanović). It is a very free translation, perhaps even a translation-adaptation of the 1804 work of French biographer Pierre Blanchard (1772–1856). Ivanović translated this work from German, but he also used the works of the German writer Friedrich Schiller, adding the biographies of the great Serb men.

Only five years after Blanchard's original appeared in print in France, the general reader in Ottoman-occupied Serbia and Habsburg Monarchy was to see the first biographies of not only Plutarch but Homer, Voltaire, Socrates, Cicero, Plato, and others. About Homer, Ivanović wrote, "We know so little about him that the more we search the less we know", raising the Homeric Question.

See also
 Dositej Obradović
 Pavle Solarić
 Lazar Bojić
 Avram Mrazović
 Teodor Janković Mirijevski
 Atanasije Dimitrijević Sekereš
 Stefan Vujanovski
 Uroš Nestorović
 Dimitrie Eustatievici
 Djordje Natošević

References 

Serbian writers
Serbian Roman Catholic priests
1773 births
1849 deaths